The Berones were a pre-Roman Celtic people of ancient Spain, although they were not part of the Celtiberians, they lived north of the Celtiberians and close to the Cantabrian Conisci in the middle Ebro region between the Tirón and Alhama rivers.

Origins 
The ancestors of the Berones were Celts who migrated from Gaul to the Iberia around the 4th century BC to settle in La Rioja and the southern parts of the Soria, Álava and Navarre provinces.

Location 
 
A stock-raising people that practiced transhumance, their capital was Varia or Vareia (Custodia de Viana; Celtiberian-type mint: Uaracos Auta?), situated near Logroño at the middle Ebro in La Rioja and controlled the towns of Libia (Herramélluri or Leiva – La Rioja), Tritium Megallum (Tricio), Bilibium (Bilibio, near Conchas de Haro – La Rioja) and Contrebia Leukade (Aguillar del Rio Alhama – La Rioja).

History 

Allies of the Autrigones, the Berones appear to have kept themselves out of the Celtiberian confederacy throughout the 3rd-2nd centuries BC but later came under pressure of the Vascones. Their earliest contact with Rome might have occurred during the early 2nd century BC, when they allegedly fought as allies of the Celtiberians at the battle of Calagurris in 186 BC, being defeated by the Praetor of Hispania Citerior Lucius Manlius Adicinus Fulvianus. According to a Roman epigraphic source, the Ascoli-Picenum bronze (now at the Museo Capitolino, Rome), Beronian mercenary cavalrymen later entered Roman service at the Social War (91–88 BC), fighting alongside other Spaniards in the Turma Saluitana as auxiliary cavalry in Italy though they subsequently aided their Autrigones' allies in the defence of their respective territories in northern Celtiberia against Sertorius' invasion attempt in 76 BC.

See also 
Celtiberian confederacy 
Celtiberian script
Celtiberian Wars
Sertorian Wars 
Pre-Roman peoples of the Iberian Peninsula

Notes

References

Ángel Montenegro Duque et alli, Historia de España 2 – colonizaciones y formacion de los pueblos prerromanos, Editorial Gredos, Madrid (1989) 
Francisco Burillo Motoza, Los Celtíberos – Etnias y Estados, Crítica, Grijalbo Mondadori, S.A., Barcelona (1998, revised edition 2007)

Further reading

Daniel Varga, The Roman Wars in Spain: The Military Confrontation with Guerrilla Warfare, Pen & Sword Military, Barnsley (2015) 
Philip Matyszak, Sertorius and the struggle for Spain, Pen & Sword Military, Barnsley (2013) 
Ludwig Heinrich Dyck, The Roman Barbarian Wars: The Era of Roman Conquest, Author Solutions (2011) ISBNs 1426981821, 9781426981821

External links
http://www.celtiberia.net
http://www.montebernorio.com

Pre-Roman peoples of the Iberian Peninsula
Celtic tribes of the Iberian Peninsula
Ancient peoples of Spain